The Redback on the Toilet Seat is an Australian country music EP, with all four tracks written and performed by Slim Newton. It was released in June 1972 and peaked at No. 3 on the Go-Set National Top 40 Singles Chart. It was recorded at Hadley Records Audio Studios (catalogue number HEP 537) in Tamworth, New South Wales, and it was the first record Newton made. The title song references the Redback spider (Latrodectus hasselti), also known as the Australian black widow.

At the 1973 Country Music Awards of Australia, the EP won Top Selling Album of the Year.

Track listing
Side one
1. "The Redback on the Toilet Seat" (Newton) – 2:18 
2. "A Pint of Water in a Jerry Can" (Newton) – 2:21

Side two
1. "Something Seems to Tell Me" (Newton) – 2:21
2. "If You Want to Make Something out of this Life" (Newton) – 2:26

Credits
Newton – vocals, acoustic guitar, electric guitar
Gary Brown – bass guitar
Ken Grills – drums
Ian Fenton – cover illustration

Cover versions
"The Redback on the Toilet Seat" has been covered by several artists including: John Williamson, The Wolverines on Occasional Course Language (2008).

References

External links
[https://www.youtube.com/watch?v=TjDAiq2-xeU "Slim Newton - Redneck 
on the Toilet Seat"] hosted on YouTube

1972 EPs
Slim Newton EPs